The Sextet for Horns and String Quartet, Op. 81b, was written by composer Ludwig van Beethoven, probably around 1795, and published by Simrock Verlag in 1810. It is in the key of E major and is scored for two horns and a string quartet. It was probably modelled on the Horn Quintet in the same key  by Mozart (K. 407) and like the earlier work it is written in a concertante style, with virtuosic writing for the two horns.

Background
Prior to the publication by Simrock in 1810, nothing is known about the circumstances of the piece's composition beyond the existence of a few sketches that confirm the work was composed in the mid 1790s. The concertante nature of the piece, has led writers like John Henken to speculate that the piece may have been written for specific Bonn-based performers, and to express surprise that more is not known about the work's early history.

Structure
The piece consists of three movements:

The typical performance time is around 15 - 17 minutes.

References 
Notes

Sources

External links
 
  - Performed by members of the National Symphony Orchestra.

Chamber music by Ludwig van Beethoven
1795 compositions
Compositions in E-flat major
Compositions for horn
Compositions for sextet